The Desert Sunlight Solar Farm is a 550 megawatt (MWAC) photovoltaic power station approximately six miles north of Desert Center, California, United States, in the Mojave Desert. It uses approximately 8.8 million cadmium telluride modules made by the US thin-film manufacturer First Solar. As of Fall 2015, the Solar Farm has the same 550 MW installed capacity as the Topaz Solar Farm in the Carrizo Plain region of Central California, making both of them tied for the second largest completed solar plants by installed capacity.

Project details 

Project construction took place in two phases, both of which are supported by power purchase agreements.

Phase I has a capacity of 300 MW, which will be sold to Pacific Gas & Electric Company. Phase II has a capacity of 250 MW, which will be sold to Southern California Edison. The project was expected to involve more than 550 construction jobs in Riverside County, California. Construction began in September, 2011 and final completion was in January 2015.

The $1.46 billion in loans for the project are partially guaranteed by DOE and will be funded by a group of investors led by Goldman Sachs Lending Partners, which submitted the project under the Financial Institution Partnership Program (FIPP), and Citigroup Global Markets Inc. as co-lead arranger.

A 230 MW and 920 MWh (4-hour) battery storage power station was added in 2022.

Electricity production

Environmental issues 

In 2012 the National Parks Conservation Association issued a report identifying three desert solar power plants sited within five miles of National Parks in the California Desert as projects that they suggest should not have been approved in their locations, including the Desert Sunlight Solar Farm. The group cites damage to visual resources, and impacts on desert species.

See also

 
 Topaz Solar Farm
 Photovoltaics
 List of photovoltaic power stations

References

Solar power in the Mojave Desert
Solar power stations in California
Buildings and structures in Riverside County, California
Desert Center, California
Energy infrastructure completed in 2015
2015 establishments in California
NextEra Energy